The Legislative Assembly of Rostov Oblast is the regional parliament of Rostov Oblast, a federal subject of Russia. A total of 60 deputies are elected for five-year terms.

Elections

2018

References

Rostov Oblast
Politics of Rostov Oblast